Henry Ridgely Warfield (September 14, 1774 – March 18, 1839) was a U.S. Representative from Maryland.  He was born in Anne Arundel County, Maryland, at the 1300-acre property "Bushy Park". He was the son of Charles Alexander Warfield and Eliza Ridgely, and grandson of Maj. Henry Ridgely. His father, Dr. Warfield (1751–1813), was an originator of the medical school of the University of Maryland, and as a member of the Whig club, set fire to the Peggy Stewart at Annapolis, Maryland, destroying her cargo of tea.

He held several local offices.  He later settled in Frederick, Maryland, and was elected to the Sixteenth, Seventeenth, and Eighteenth Congresses, serving from March 4, 1819, to March 3, 1825, as a Federalist representative.  He died in Frederick.

References

1774 births
1839 deaths
Politicians from Frederick, Maryland
Federalist Party members of the United States House of Representatives from Maryland
Henry
Ridgely family